A distortion meter is a type of electronic test equipment used to determine specific frequencies that cause distortion in electronic devices. The device is primarily used in audio related equipment.

Features and uses
A typical unit injects a signal in to the input of a circuit and monitors the output of the circuit for distortion.

Types of Distortion

1) Amplitude distortion.
2) Frequency distortion.
3) Phase distortion.
4) Intermodulation distortion.
5) Cross over distortion.

See also
Electronic test equipment

Electronic test equipment
Measuring instruments
Laboratory equipment
Electronics work tools